The Mitten is a bare flat-topped mountain, which resembles a mitten when viewed from above, standing  northwest of Mount Armytage in Victoria Land, Antarctica. It was named by the Southern Party of the New Zealand Geological Survey Antarctic Expedition of 1962–63 because of its mitten-like shape.

Thumb Point is a rock spur extending from the northwest side of The Mitten, named because the feature resembles the thumb on a mitten.

References

Mountains of Victoria Land
Scott Coast